is a railway station on the Iida Line in the city of Komagane, Nagano Prefecture, Japan, operated by Central Japan Railway Company (JR Central).

Lines
Ina-Fukuoka Station is served by the Iida Line and is 162.9 kilometers from the starting point of the line at Toyohashi Station.

Station layout
The station consists of two ground-level opposed side platforms. There is no station building, but only a shelter built on the platform. The station is unattended.

Platforms

Adjacent stations

History
Ina-Fukuoka Station opened on 16 December 1914. With the privatization of Japanese National Railways (JNR) on 1 April 1987, the station came under the control of JR Central.

Passenger statistics
In fiscal 2015, the station was used by an average of 326 passengers daily (boarding passengers only).

Surrounding area

Komagame Technical High School

See also
 List of railway stations in Japan

References

External links

 Ina-Fukuoka Station information 

Railway stations in Nagano Prefecture
Railway stations in Japan opened in 1914
Stations of Central Japan Railway Company
Iida Line
Komagane, Nagano